Lahamaide, also known as La Hamaide, is a village in Wallonia, Belgium, located in the municipality of Ellezelles, Hainaut Province. It was the place of birth of Lamoral, Count of Egmont, who was born at the Château de Lahamaide in 1522.

References 

Populated places in Hainaut (province)